Nagygeresd is a village in Vas county, Hungary with a population 266 inhabitants by 1 January 2010.

References

External links
 Street map (Hungarian)

Populated places in Vas County